Hymenocallis acutifolia is a plant species first described in 1826 with the name  Hymenocallis littoralis var. acutifolia.  It is endemic to Mexico, known from the States of Oaxaca, Michoacán, Jalisco, Veracruz, Puebla, and Nayarit.

References

acutifolia
Flora of Mexico
Plants described in 1826